YRP may refer to:

 The three-letter code for Ottawa/Carp Airport
 The initials for the three protagonists of the game Final Fantasy X-2: Yuna, Rikku and Paine
 Yellow Ribbon Project, a community initiative organised by the Community Action for Rehabilitation of Ex-offenders Network in Singapore
 Yokosuka Research Park
 Initials for York Regional Police
 "YRP", a song by Swans from Soundtracks for the Blind